The 2014–15 Green Bay Phoenix men's basketball team represented the University of Wisconsin–Green Bay in the 2014–15 NCAA Division I men's basketball season. Their head coach was fifth year coach Brian Wardle. The Phoenix played their home games at the Resch Center and were members of the Horizon League. They finished the season 24–9, 12–4 in Horizon League play to finish in second place. They advanced to the semifinals of the Horizon League tournament where they lost to Valparaiso. They were invited to the National Invitation Tournament where they lost in the first round to Illinois State.

Keifer Sykes was named the Horizon League Player of the Year for the second year in a row. Jordan Fouse won conference All-Defensive team honors.

Roster

Schedule

|-
!colspan=9 style="background:#006633; color:#FFFFFF;"|  Exhibition

|-
!colspan=9 style="background:#006633; color:#FFFFFF;"|  Regular season

|-
!colspan=9 style="background:#006633; color:#FFFFFF;"| Horizon League tournament

|-
!colspan=9 style="background:#006633; color:#FFFFFF;"| NIT

References

Green Bay Phoenix
Green Bay Phoenix men's basketball seasons
Green Bay
Wiscon
Wiscon